The Electoral division of Leven was an electoral division in the Tasmanian Legislative Council of Australia. It existed for two years from 1997 to 1999 and faced a single by-election in 1997. The seat was a renaming of the old seat of Meander, which was then renamed Montgomery.

Members

See also
Tasmanian Legislative Council electoral divisions

References
Past election results for Leven

Former electoral districts of Tasmania
1999 disestablishments in Australia